Comadia is a genus of moths in the family Cossidae first described by William Barnes and James Halliday McDunnough in 1911.

Species
 Comadia albistrigata Barnes & McDunnough, 1918
 Comadia alleni Brown, 1975
 Comadia arenae Brown, 1975
 Comadia bertholdi Grote, 1880
 Comadia dolli Barnes & Benjamin, 1923
 Comadia henrici Grote, 1882
 Comadia intrusa Barnes & Benjamin, 1923
 Comadia manfredi Neumann, 1884
 Comadia redtenbacheri Hammerschmidt, 1848
 Comadia speratus Brown, 1975
 Comadia suaedivora Brown & Allen, 1973
 Comadia subterminata Barnes & Benjamin, 1923

References

 , 1975: A revision the North American Comadia (Cossidae). The Journal of Research on the Lepidoptera, 14 (4): 180–212. Full article:

External links

Cossinae
Moth genera